Generis is the name of a typeface designed by type designer Erik Faulhaber. Generis was first published in November 2006 by Linotype.

The Generis is a type system consisting of four type families compatible both in style and metrics. It consists of 28 fonts in 6 weights. OpenType features include small caps and old style figures. To improve legibility, open letter forms include wider openings, numbers are designed with maximum individuality, lowercase “l” in Generis Sans is curved, elimination of descenders in capital letters.

The Generis type families include Generis Serif, the elegant serif style with a classical essence; Generis Slab, the stable slab serif with technical characteristics; Generis Sans, the clear sans serif with an objective appearance; Generis Simple, the simplified sans serif with a contemporary nature, similar to FF Dax. The type system it is similar to the Compatil type family. The compatibility of the corresponding typefaces in the Generis type system allows document and graphic designers to create well balanced documents using the harmonizing typefaces.

The fonts support ISO Adobe 2, Adobe CE, Latin Extended character sets.

Family summary

External links 
 About the Generis type system
 Weights of the Generis type system
Linotype launches a new typeface system with gothic appeal - December 8, 2006: The genus of Generis

Linotype typefaces
Unified serif and sans-serif typeface families

Typefaces and fonts introduced in 2006